This list of synagogues in Slovakia contains active, otherwise used and destroyed synagogues in Slovakia. The list of Slovakian synagogues is not necessarily complete, as only a negligible number of sources testify to the existence of some synagogues.

In all cases the year of the completion of the building is given. Italics indicate an approximate date.

Bratislavský kraj

Trnavský kraj

Trenčiansky kraj

Nitriansky kraj

Žilinský kraj

Banskobystrický kraj

Prešovský kraj

Košický kraj

References

Sources 
 Old postcards and pictures of synagogues in Slovakia – judaica.cz
 Maroš Borský: Synagogue Architecture in Slovakia Towards Creating a Memorial Landscape of Lost Community Dissertation: Center for Jewish Studies Heidelberg 2005 including PDF-file with pictures, (last accessed 30. September 2020)
 http://judaica.cz/?page_id=2756
 http://judaica.cz/?page_id=8827
 http://judaica.cz/?page_id=8830
 http://judaica.cz/?page_id=2759
 http://judaica.cz/?page_id=2762
 https://core.ac.uk/download/pdf/32579528.pdf

Other literature 
 Pusztay Sándor: Zsinagógák Szlovákiában – Zsinagógák, zsidó temetők, emlékhelyek, Kornétás Kiadó, 2018, 

 
Slovakia
Synagogues